František Stejskal (7 December 1895 – 27 February 1975) was a Czech athlete. He competed in the men's triple jump and the men's high jump at the 1920 Summer Olympics.

References

1895 births
1975 deaths
Athletes (track and field) at the 1920 Summer Olympics
Czech male triple jumpers
Czech male high jumpers
Olympic athletes of Czechoslovakia
Place of birth missing